The 2019–20 Slovenian Third League was the 28th edition of the Slovenian Third League. The season began on 24 August 2019 and was scheduled to end in June 2020. The competition was cancelled on 17 April 2020 due to the COVID-19 pandemic.

Competition format and rules
In the 2019–20 season, the Slovenian Third League (3. SNL) was divided into two regional groups with a total of 26 participating clubs. The West group was composed of 14 clubs, and the East group of 12 clubs. The group winners earned direct promotion to the Slovenian Second League.

3. SNL East

Clubs

A total of 12 teams competed in the league, including 10 sides from the 2018–19 season and the 2 teams promoted from the Intercommunal Leagues (Korotan Prevalje and Podvinci).

League table

Results

3. SNL West

Clubs

League table

References

3
Slovenian Third League seasons
Slovenian Third League, 2019-20
Slovenia